Cisleithania, officially The Kingdoms and Lands Represented in the Imperial Council, was the northern and western part of Austria-Hungary, the Dual Monarchy created in the Compromise of 1867—as distinguished from Transleithania (i.e., the Hungarian Lands of the Crown of Saint Stephen east of ["beyond"] the Leitha River). This name for the region was a common, but unofficial one.

The Cisleithanian capital was Vienna, the residence of the Austrian emperor. The territory had a population of 28,571,900 in 1910. It reached from Vorarlberg in the west to the Kingdom of Galicia and Lodomeria and the Duchy of Bukovina (today part of Ukraine and Romania) in the east, as well as from the Kingdom of Bohemia in the north to the Kingdom of Dalmatia (today part of Croatia) in the south. It comprised the current States of Austria (except for Burgenland), as well as most of the territories of the Czech Republic and Slovenia (except for Prekmurje), southern Poland and parts of Italy (Trieste, Gorizia, Tarvisio, Trentino, and South Tyrol), Croatia (Istria, Dalmatia), Montenegro (Kotor Bay), Romania (Southern Bukovina), and Ukraine (Northern Bukovina and Galicia).

Term

The Latin name Cisleithania derives from that of the Leitha River, a tributary of the Danube forming the historical boundary between the Archduchy of Austria and the Hungarian Kingdom in the area southeast of Vienna (on the way to Budapest). Much of its territory lay west (or, from a Viennese perspective, on "this" side) of the Leitha.

After the constitutional changes of the Austro-Hungarian Compromise of 1867, the Cisleithanian crown lands (Kronländer) continued to constitute the Austrian Empire, but the latter term was rarely used to avoid confusion with the era before 1867, when the Kingdom of Hungary had been a constituent part of that empire. The somewhat cumbersome official name was Die im Reichsrat vertretenen Königreiche und Länder ("The Kingdoms and Lands represented in the Imperial Council"). The phrase was used by politicians and bureaucrats, but it had no official status until 1915; the press and the general public seldom used it and then with a derogatory connotation. In general, the lands were just called Austria, but the term "Austrian lands" (Österreichische Länder) originally did not apply to the Lands of the Bohemian Crown (i.e., Bohemia proper, the Margraviate of Moravia and Duchy of Silesia) or to the territories annexed in the 18th-century Partitions of Poland (Galicia) or the former Venetian Dalmatia.

From 1867, the Kingdom of Hungary, the Kingdom of Croatia, the Kingdom of Slavonia and the Principality of Transylvania were no longer "Austrian" crown lands. Rather, they constituted an autonomous state, officially called the "Lands of the Holy Hungarian Crown of St Stephen" ( or A Magyar Szent Korona Országai) and commonly known as Transleithania or just Hungary. The Condominium of Bosnia and Herzegovina, occupied in 1878, formed a separate part. Both the "Austrian" and "Hungarian" lands of the Dual Monarchy had large Slavic-settled territories in the north (Czechs, Slovaks, Poles and Ruthenians) as well as in the south (Slovenes, Croats and Serbs).

Crown lands
Cisleithania consisted of 15 crown lands which had representatives in the Imperial Council (Reichsrat), the Cisleithanian parliament in Vienna. The crown lands centered on the Archduchy of Austria (Erzherzogtum Österreich) were not states, but provinces in the modern sense. However, they were areas with unique historic political and legal characteristics and were therefore more than mere administrative districts. They have been conceived of as "historical-political entities".

Each crown land had a regional assembly, the Landtag, which enacted laws (Landesgesetze) on matters of regional and mostly minor importance. Until 1848, the Landtage had been traditional diets (assemblies of the estates of the realm). They were disbanded after the Revolutions of 1848 and reformed after 1860. Some members held their position as ex officio members (e.g., bishops), while others were elected. There was no universal and equal suffrage, but a mixture of privilege and limited franchise. The executive committee of a Landtag was called Landesausschuss and headed by a Landeshauptmann, being president of the Landtag as well.

From 1868 onwards Emperor Franz Joseph himself (in his function as monarch of a crown land, being king, archduke, grandduke, duke or count) and his Imperial–Royal (k.k.) government headed by the Minister-President of Austria were represented at the capital cities of the crown lands—except for Vorarlberg which was administered with Tyrol, and Istria and Gorizia-Gradisca which were administered together with Trieste under the common name of Austro-Illyrian Littoral— by a stadtholder (Statthalter), in few crown lands called Landespräsident, who acted as chief executive.

Kingdoms
  Kingdom of Bohemia (Land of the Bohemian Crown)
  Kingdom of Dalmatia
  Kingdom of Galicia and Lodomeria

Archduchies
  Archduchy of Austria above the Enns (unofficially Upper Austria)
  Archduchy of Austria below the Enns (unofficially Lower Austria)

Grand duchies
  Grand Duchy of Kraków (Subdivision of Galicia and Lodomeria)

Duchies
  Duchy of Bukovina
  Duchy of Carinthia
  Duchy of Carniola
  Duchy of Salzburg
  Duchy of Silesia (Land of the Bohemian Crown)
  Duchy of Styria

Margraviates
  Margraviate of Istria (Part of the Austrian Littoral)
  Margraviate of Moravia (Land of the Bohemian Crown)

Princely Counties
  Princely County of Gorizia and Gradisca (Part of the Austrian Littoral)
  Princely County of Tyrol
  Princely County of Vorarlberg

Free Cities
  Free City of Trieste (Part of the Austrian Littoral)

Condominium
  Condominium of Bosnia and Herzegovina (Governed Jointly by Cisleithania and Transleithania) from 1878

Politics
According to the "December Constitution", a redraft of the emperor's 1861 February Patent, the Austrian government was generally responsible in all affairs concerning the Cisleithanian lands, except for the common Austro-Hungarian Army, the Austro-Hungarian Navy and the Foreign Ministry, these k.u.k. matters remained reserved for the Imperial and Royal Ministers' Council for Common Affairs of Austria-Hungary.

The Austrian Reichsrat, a bicameral legislature implemented in 1861, became the Cisleithanian parliament. Originally consisting of delegates of the Landtage, in 1873 direct election of the House of Deputies (Abgeordnetenhaus) was introduced with a four-class franchise suffrage for male landowners and bourgeois. Equal, direct, secret and universal suffrage—for men—was not introduced until a 1907 electoral reform. In this Lower House (with 353 members in 1873 and 516 in 1907), at first German-speaking deputies dominated, but with the extension of the suffrage the Slavs gained a majority. An ethnic nationalist struggle between German-speaking and Slavic deputies, especially in the context of the Czech National Revival, was played out. Leaders of the movement like František Palacký advocated the emancipation of the Slavic population within the Monarchy (Austroslavism), while politicians of the Young Czech Party principally denied the right of the Reichsrat to put any decisions relevant for the "Czech lands", and used means of filibustering as well as absence to torpedo its work. They were antagonized by radical German nationalists led by Georg von Schönerer, demanding the dissolution of the Monarchy and the unification of the "German Austrian" lands with the German Empire.

After 1893, no k.k. government was able to rely on a parliamentary majority. Nevertheless, Polish members of parliament and politicians like Count Kasimir Felix Badeni achieved some success involving Galician Poles by special regulations for this "developing country"; thence the Polenklub played a constructive role most of the time. Politics were frequently paralysed because of the tensions between different nationalities. When Czech obstruction at the Reichsrat prevented the parliament from working, the emperor went on to rule autocratically through imperial decrees (Kaiserliche Verordnungen) submitted by his government. The Reichsrat was prorogued in March 1914 at the behest of Minister-President Count Karl von Stürgkh, it did not meet during the July Crisis and was not reconvened until May 1917, after the accession of Emperor Karl in 1916.

For representation in matters relevant to the whole real union of Austria-Hungary (foreign affairs, defence, and the financing thereof) the Reichsrat appointed delegations of 60 members to discuss these matters parallel to Hungarian delegations of the same size and to come, in separate votes, to the same conclusion on the recommendation of the responsible common ministry. In Cisleithania, the 60 delegates consisted of 40 elected members of the House of Representatives (Abgeordnetenhaus) and 20 members of the Upper House (Herrenhaus). The delegations convened simultaneously, both either in Vienna or in Budapest, though spatially divided. In case of not getting the same decision in three attempts, the law permitted the summoning of a common session of both delegations and the eventual counting of the votes in total, but the Hungarians, who averted any Imperial "roof" over their part of the dual monarchy, as well as the common ministers, carefully avoided reaching this situation. Austria-Hungary as a common entity did not have its own jurisdiction and legislative power, which was shaped by the fact that there was no common parliament. The common diplomatic and military affairs were managed by delegations from the Imperial Council and the Hungarian parliament. According to the compromise, the members of the delegates from the two parliaments had no right to debate, they had no right to introduce new perspectives and own ideas during the meetings, they were nothing more than the extended arms of their own parliaments. All decisions had to be ratified by the Imperial council in Vienna and by the Hungarian parliament in Budapest. Without the Austrian and Hungarian parliamentary ratifications, the decisions of the delegates were not valid in Austria or in Kingdom of Hungary.

Population

The largest group within Cisleithania were Austrian Germans (including Yiddish-speaking Jews), who made up around a third of the population. German-speakers and Czechs made up a majority of the population. Almost 60% of Cisleithania's population was ethnically Slavic.

See also 
 Imperial Crown of Austria
 Republic of German-Austria

Notes

References

 
.
Leitha
Geography of Austria-Hungary
Geography of Central Europe
1867 establishments in Austria-Hungary
1918 disestablishments in Austria-Hungary
History of Austria-Hungary